Ermetus is a genus of spiders in the family Mimetidae. It was first described in 2008 by Ponomarev. , it contains only one species, Ermetus inopinabilis, found in Borneo.

References

Mimetidae
Monotypic Araneomorphae genera
Spiders of Asia